is a Japanese-American animated series co-produced by The Walt Disney Company and Toei Animation. It began airing on Toon Disney in Japan on June 21, 2008. The episodes are animated in 3D. The show premiered in the United States on June 29, 2009 on Disney XD as simply "RoboDz". The series also aired on Disney Channel Asia. It is the first anime to be co-produced by Disney Jeff Nimoy announced at The Anime Lodge that he would be writing and directing the English adaptation. It is a shortform series with each episode lasting approximately 5 minutes.

Overview

Story

Staff
 Series Director: Daisuke Nishio
 Series Composition: Yoshimichi Hosoi
 Character Designs by: Naoki Miyahara
 CG Director: Kazuhiro Nishikawa
 Producers: Yoshiyuki Ikezawa (Toei Animation), Michiyo Hayashi (Walt Disney Television International Japan)

Image Song
 "Imaike Samba" （Sony Music Entertainment）
 Lyrics by: Yasu Ichiban, Crystal Boy, Hidden Fish, Nori da Funky Shibire-sasu/Composed by: DJ Mitsu/Performed by: Nobodyknows+

Episode list

Season 1

See also
 Marvel Disk Wars: The Avengers (The second co-production between Walt Disney Japan and Toei Animation.)

Notes

External links 
  at Toei Animation
 

2008 anime television series debuts
Science fiction anime and manga
Comedy anime and manga
Television series by Disney
Disney animated television series
Toei Animation television